The 1992 Seoul Open was a men's tennis tournament played on outdoor hard courts that was part of the World Series of the 1992 ATP Tour. It was played at Seoul in South Korea from April 20 through April 27, 1992. Fifth-seeded Shuzo Matsuoka won the singles title.

Finals

Singles

 Shuzo Matsuoka defeated  Todd Woodbridge 6–3, 4–6, 7–5
 It was Matsuoka's only title of the year and the 2nd of his career.

Doubles

 Kevin Curren /  Gary Muller defeated  Kelly Evernden /  Brad Pearce 7–6, 6–4
 It was Curren's only title of the year and the 31st of his career. It was Muller's only title of the year and the 6th of his career.

References

External links
 ITF tournament edition details

 
Seoul Open
Seoul Open